Ralph H. "Pat" Patterson is an American politician and insurance agent. He was a member of the Florida House of Representatives and a member of the Republican Party.

Biography 
Pat Patterson was born on October 12, 1948 in West Palm Beach.

Patterson served in the U.S. Navy from 1969 to 1973. He attended Florida Atlantic University, earning a B.A. in Education in 1976 and taught in elementary school from 1976 to 1978. He earned a Master of Education degree in 1978. Since 1978, Patterson has been an insurance agent.

Political career 
Patterson was a member of the Volusia County Council from 1995 to 1998, serving as Vice Chair in 1996 and Chair in 1997.

Patterson was first elected to the Florida House of Representatives in November 1998 for a term of two years. He was defeated for re-election in 2000. He returned to the Florida House in November 2002 and was re-elected in 2004 and 2006.

He was appointed Chairman of the Committee on Community College and Workforce by House Speaker Allan Bense in 2004 and later appointed Chairman of the Committee on Ethics and Elections by House Speaker Marco Rubio in 2006.

He represents District 26, which consists of parts of Volusia and Flagler counties.

Personal 
He is married to Anne and they are the parents of four children and seven grandchildren.

References

External links 
Pat Patterson's Official Florida House Page
Representative Pat Patterson (FL) at Project Vote Smart

1948 births
Living people
People from West Palm Beach, Florida
American Presbyterians
Businesspeople in insurance
Republican Party members of the Florida House of Representatives
People from DeLand, Florida